Bits and Mortar is an online organization of publishers who support brick and mortar game stores.

Background 
Bits and Mortar was established in July 2010, alternately referred to as a publisher's alliance, initiative, or coalition, which advocates for support of brick and mortar games stores. Founding organizations include Arc Dream Publishing, Cellar Games, Cubicle 7, Evil Hat Productions, Pelgrane Press, and Rogue Games.

Prior to their foundation, gaming publishers providing proprietary methods of supplying gaming documentation, such as PDFs, to retail customers of brick and mortar stores. Fred Hicks, founder of Evil Hat Productions and other publishers agreed to establish a non-profit organization to centralize the release and distribution of documentation. The Bits and Mortar initiative was eventually announced at Gen Con 2010.

Fred Hicks said:

We love real, physical brick and mortar game stores, and we want to see them survive — and thrive — even as the digital content options for gaming become more prevalent. Today's game-buying customers want the best of both worlds: the portability of an e-book, and the lasting durability of one made out of paper, glue, and ink. They want to be able to support their favorite local game stores, and they want to be able to support their favorite publishers. The Bits and Mortar initiative is all about making sure they don’t have to choose one or the other. We want them to choose both, every time.

References

External links 
 

Online nonprofit organizations
Gaming organizations